Sinesetosa acugena is a species of beetle in the family Carabidae, the only species in the genus Sinesetosa.

References

Scaritinae